The World Is Not Enough is the 1999 soundtrack of the 19th James Bond film of the same name and the second Bond soundtrack composed by David Arnold. The score features more instances of electronic music, which Arnold included to "make the thing a little more contemporary". To add an ethnic flavor to tracks that conveyed the film's Turkey and Central Asia setting, Arnold brought in percussionist Pete Lockett, qanun player Abdullah Chhadeh, and singer Natacha Atlas.

Arnold broke tradition by not ending the film with a new song or a reprise of the opening theme. Originally, Arnold intended to use the song "Only Myself to Blame", written by David Arnold & Don Black and sung by Scott Walker and inspired by the failed romance between Bond and Elektra King, who turns out to be a villain. However, director Michael Apted "felt it was too much of a downer for the end of the movie" and Arnold replaced it with a techno remix of the "James Bond Theme". "Only Myself to Blame", is the nineteenth and final track on the album.

The soundtrack was recorded across six days in September 1999 by an 83-piece orchestra conducted by Arnold collaborator Nicholas Dodd. Dodd described The World Is Not Enough as his favorite Bond score.

Elektra King was provided with her own theme, most prominently heard in "Casino," "Elektra's Theme" and "I Never Miss." Arnold added two new themes to the Bond repertoire with this score, both of which are reused in Die Another Day. The first is an action theme, performed on the upper-registers of the piano, heard during "Pipeline" and "Submarine." The second is a romance theme, first heard in the film during the skiing sequence, but not heard here until the "Christmas in Turkey" cue, in a simple arrangement for piano. Neil Hannon of The Divine Comedy also wrote a theme song for the film, but it was rejected.

In 2018, La-La Land Records released a two-disc limited and expanded edition of the complete score by Arnold. The title song is also contained in the release along with some unreleased material.

Track listing
 "The World Is Not Enough" – Garbage
 "Show Me the Money"
 "Come in 007, Your Time Is Up"
 "Access Denied"
 "M's Confession"
 "Welcome to Baku"
 "Casino"
 "Ice Bandits"
 "Elektra's Theme"
 "Body Double"
 "Going Down/The Bunker"
 "Pipeline"
 "Remember Pleasure"
 "Caviar Factory"
 "Torture Queen"
 "I Never Miss"
 "Submarine"
 "Christmas in Turkey"
 "Only Myself to Blame" – Scott Walker (David Arnold/Don Black)
 "Sweetest Coma Again"* – Luna Sea featuring DJ Krush

* Track 20 is only included in the Japanese album release.

See also
 Outline of James Bond

Notes
 Reached #106 on UK Charts.
 Release 1 is an enhanced CD including U.S. movie trailer.
 Release 2 (MVCE-24204) includes "Sweetest Coma Again" as track #20 (played during the credits in the Japanese version of The World Is Not Enough).

References

Soundtrack albums from James Bond films
Soundtrack
David Arnold soundtracks
1999 soundtrack albums